A Stranger in Tibet is the story of Ekai Kawaguchi and his travels in Tibet and Nepal at the turn of the 20th century. Kawaguchi, a Zen Buddhist monk, was the first Japanese explorer to enter Nepal, in 1897, and Tibet, in 1900. His goal was to find ancient copies of sanskrit documents related to Buddhism. Since Tibet was closed to foreigners at that time, Kawaguchi travelled disguised as a Chinese monk. The book is a combination biography, travel book and history of the region, and also explains differences in the beliefs and practices of different schools of Buddhism.

References

Books about Tibet
History of Tibet
Books about Tibetan Buddhism
Biographies (books)
1989 non-fiction books